Sijara Jihan Eubanks (born April 27, 1985) is an American professional mixed martial artist, who competed in the women's bantamweight division of the Ultimate Fighting Championship.

Background
Eubanks was born and raised in Springfield, Massachusetts, and graduated from the High School of Commerce. She then went to Morgan State University. She started training Brazilian jiu-jitsu under Lloyd Irvin in 2008 and to extend her repertoire for mixed martial arts, she later started boxing and other disciplines. She competed in jiu-jitsu, winning the Women's No-Gi Advanced Absolute division in the 2011 Grapplers Quest World Championship Finals and IBJJF World Championship as a brown belt in 2014.

Mixed martial arts career

Early career
After an undefeated MMA record as an amateur, she turned professional in April 2015.

Invicta FC
Eubanks made her professional debut on April 24, 2015 against Gina Begley at Invicta FC 12. She won the fight via TKO in the first round.

In her second pro bout, Eubanks faced Katlyn Chookagian at Cage Fury FC 52 on October 31, 2015. She lost the fight via unanimous decision.

In her second fight for Invicta FC, Eubanks faced AmberLynn Orr on July 29, 2016 at Invicta FC 18. She won the fight via TKO in the first round.

In her third fight for the promotion, Eubanks faced Aspen Ladd on January 14, 2017 at Invicta FC 21. She lost the fight by unanimous decision, bringing her record to 2-2 before joining The Ultimate Fighter.

The Ultimate Fighter

In August 2017,  Eubanks was announced to be one of the fighters featured on The Ultimate Fighter 26, where the process to crown the UFC's inaugural 125-pound women's champion was to take place.

In the first round, Eubanks defeated Maia Stevenson via submission  in the second round, allowing her to move on to the next stage of the competition. In the quarterfinals, Eubanks faced DeAnna Bennett and won the fight by a knockout in round one. In the semifinals, Eubanks faced Roxanne Modafferi. She won the fight via unanimous decision after three rounds.

Ultimate Fighting Championship 
Eubanks was scheduled to face Nicco Montaño on December 1, 2017, at The Ultimate Fighter 26 Finale for the inaugural UFC Women's Flyweight Championship. She was  pulled from the fight for kidney failure while trying to make weight, and was replaced by Roxanne Modafferi.

Eubanks made her UFC debut against Lauren Murphy at UFC Fight Night: Rivera vs. Moraes on June 1, 2018. She won the bout by unanimous decision.

Eubanks was scheduled to face Valentina Shevchenko for the vacant UFC Women's Flyweight Championship at UFC 230 on November 3, 2018. However, the fight was canceled on October 9, 2018 after the UFC announced that a fight between Daniel Cormier and Derrick Lewis would instead main event UFC 230 and that Shevchenko would also return to her original bout for the vacant title, against Joanna Jędrzejczyk at UFC 231. Eubanks remained on the card and faced Roxanne Modafferi. At the weigh-ins, Eubanks weighed in at 127.2 pounds, 1.2 pounds over the flyweight non-title fight limit of 126 and she was fined 20 percent of her purse, which went to her opponent Modafferi. She won the fight via unanimous decision.

A rematch with Aspen Ladd took place on May 18, 2019 at UFC Fight Night 152. Eubanks lost to Ladd for the second time by unanimous decision. This fight earned her the Fight of the Night award.

Eubanks faced Bethe Correia at UFC on ESPN+ 17. She lost the fight by unanimous decision.

Eubanks was scheduled to face Sarah Moras on April 18, 2020 at UFC 249. However, on April 9, Dana White, the president of UFC announced that this event was postponed and rescheduled to May 13, 2020 at UFC Fight Night: Smith vs. Teixeira. She won the fight via unanimous decision.

Eubanks was scheduled to face Macy Chiasson on September 5, 2020 at UFC Fight Night 176.  However, Chiasson pulled out of the fight for undisclosed medical reasons and was replaced by Karol Rosa. Rosa pulled out on September 3 due to complications related to her weight cut. Eubanks competed a week later at UFC Fight Night 177 on September 12, 2020 against Julia Avila. She won the fight via unanimous decision.

As the first fight of her new contract with the UFC, Eubanks was scheduled for a quick turnaround (replacing injured Marion Reneau) and faced Ketlen Vieira on September 27, 2020 at UFC 253. She lost the fight via unanimous decision.

Eubanks faced Pannie Kianzad on December 19, 2020 at UFC Fight Night 183. She lost the fight via unanimous decision.

Eubanks was scheduled to face Karol Rosa on June 12, 2021 at UFC 263. However, Rosa pulled out of the fight in late-May citing an injury. In turn, Eubanks was removed from the card and instead faced promotional newcomer Elise Reed on July 24, 2021 at UFC on ESPN 27. Eubanks won the fight via technical knockout in round one.

Eubanks was scheduled to face Luana Carolina, replacing Maryna Moroz, on October 16, 2021 at UFC Fight Night 195.  In turn Eubanks was pulled from the event due to Covid-19 protocol and she was replaced by Lupita Godinez.

Eubanks faced Melissa Gatto on December 18, 2021 at UFC Fight Night: Lewis vs. Daukaus. At the weigh-ins, Eubanks weighed in at 127.5 pounds, 1.5 pounds over the flyweight non-title fight limit. The bout proceeded at a catchweight. She lost the fight via body kick TKO in the third round.

Eubanks was scheduled to face Maryna Moroz  on July 9, 2022, at UFC Fight Night 209. However, the pair was moved to UFC Fight Night 210 on September 17, 2022 for undisclosed reasons. In early September, Moroz was rebooked against Jennifer Maia at UFC Fight Night 215 on November 19, 2022. In late August, Eubanks withdrew from the event for undisclosed reasons with the promotion seeking a new opponent for Moroz.

Eubanks was scheduled to face Priscila Cachoeira on January 14, 2023, at UFC Fight Night 217. However, at the weigh-ins it was announced that Eubanks was forced to withdraw due to complications with her weight cut.

It was announced in mid-January that Eubanks was released by UFC.

Professional grappling career
Eubanks is a multiple-time medallist at the IBJJF world championship at both brown and black belt.

She was invited to compete a 135lbs grappling tournament at Rise Invitational 11 on April 1, 2023.

Personal life
Eubanks is an openly lesbian athlete.

In February 2021, Eubanks came under fire from many MMA fans and media after a video was posted to her Twitter page that showed Eubanks in a physical confrontation with her former live-in partner, Lilly Ruiz, in front of their child. In a statement posted to her Instagram page, Eubanks claimed that she was the victim of domestic violence and denied any claims that she was abusive to any partners. No charges were filed.

Championships and accomplishments
Ultimate Fighting Championship
Fight of the Night (One time)

Mixed martial arts record

|-
|Loss
|align=center|7–7
|Melissa Gatto
|TKO (body kick and punches)
|UFC Fight Night: Lewis vs. Daukaus
|
|align=center|3
|align=center|0:45
|Las Vegas, Nevada, United States
|
|-
|Win
|align=center|7–6
|Elise Reed
|TKO (punches)
|UFC on ESPN: Sandhagen vs. Dillashaw
|
|align=center|1
|align=center|3:49
|Las Vegas, Nevada, United States
|
|-
|Loss
|align=center|6–6
|Pannie Kianzad
|Decision (unanimous)
|UFC Fight Night: Thompson vs. Neal
|
|align=center|3
|align=center|5:00
|Las Vegas, Nevada, United States
|
|-
|Loss
|align=center|6–5
|Ketlen Vieira
|Decision (unanimous)
|UFC 253 
|
|align=center|3
|align=center|5:00
|Abu Dhabi, United Arab Emirates
|  
|-
|Win
|align=center|6–4
|Julia Avila
|Decision (unanimous)
|UFC Fight Night: Waterson vs. Hill
|
|align=center|3
|align=center|5:00
|Las Vegas, Nevada, United States
|
|-
|Win
|align=center|5–4
|Sarah Moras
|Decision (unanimous)
|UFC Fight Night: Smith vs. Teixeira
|
|align=center|3
|align=center|5:00
|Jacksonville, Florida, United States
|
|-
|Loss
|align=center|4–4
|Bethe Correia
|Decision (unanimous)
|UFC Fight Night: Rodríguez vs. Stephens 
|
|align=center|3
|align=center|5:00
|Mexico City, Mexico
|
|-
|Loss
|align=center|4–3
|Aspen Ladd
|Decision (unanimous)
|UFC Fight Night: dos Anjos vs. Lee 
|
|align=center|3
|align=center|5:00
|Rochester, New York, United States
|
|-
|Win
|align=center|4–2
|Roxanne Modafferi
|Decision (unanimous)
|UFC 230
|
|align=center|3
|align=center|5:00
|New York City, New York, United States
|
|- 
|Win
|align=center| 3–2
|Lauren Murphy
|Decision (unanimous)
|UFC Fight Night: Rivera vs. Moraes
|
|align=center|3
|align=center|5:00
|Utica, New York, United States
|
|-
| Loss
| align=center | 2–2
| Aspen Ladd
| Decision (unanimous)
| Invicta FC 21: Anderson vs. Tweet
| 
| align=center | 3
| align=center | 5:00
| Kansas City, Missouri, United States
|
|-
|Win
|align=center|2–1
|Amber Lynn
|TKO (punches and elbows)
|Invicta FC 18: Grasso vs. Esquibel
|
|align=center|1
|align=center|4:41
|Kansas City, Missouri, United States
|
|-
|Loss
|align=center | 1–1
|Katlyn Chookagian
|Decision (unanimous)
|Cage Fury Fighting Championships 52
|
|align=center | 3
|align=center | 5:00
|Atlantic City, New Jersey, United States
|
|-
|Win
|align=center | 1–0
|Gina Begley
|TKO (punches)
|Invicta FC 12: Kankaanpää vs. Souza
|
|align=center| 1
|align=center| 4:59
|Kansas City, Missouri, United States
|
|-

|-
| Win
| align=center | 3–0
| Roxanne Modafferi
| Decision (unanimous)
| rowspan=3|The Ultimate Fighter: A New World Champion
|  (air date)
| align=center | 3
| align=center | 5:00
| rowspan=3|Las Vegas, Nevada, United States
| 
|-
| Win
| align=center | 2–0
| DeAnna Bennett
| KO (head kick)
|  (air date)
| align=center | 1
| align=center | 1:25
| 
|-
| Win
| align=center | 1–0
| Maia Stevenson
| Submission (kimura)
|  (air date)
| align=center | 2
| align=center | 1:52
|

References

External links
 
 

1985 births
Living people
LGBT mixed martial artists
Mixed martial artists from Massachusetts
Flyweight mixed martial artists
American female mixed martial artists
Bantamweight mixed martial artists
Mixed martial artists utilizing Brazilian jiu-jitsu
American practitioners of Brazilian jiu-jitsu
People awarded a black belt in Brazilian jiu-jitsu
Female Brazilian jiu-jitsu practitioners
People from Springfield, Massachusetts
LGBT African Americans
LGBT people from Massachusetts
American LGBT sportspeople
Morgan State University alumni
Ultimate Fighting Championship female fighters
Lesbian sportswomen
LGBT Brazilian jiu-jitsu practitioners
21st-century American women